Riozinho River may refer to any of several rivers in Brazil:

 Riozinho River (Amazonas)
 Riozinho River (Braço Menor)
 Riozinho River (Pará), a river of Pará
 Riozinho River (Piauí)
 Riozinho River (Pium River tributary)
 Igarapé Riozinho, Acre